Kervignac is a commune in the Morbihan department of Brittany in north-western France.

Demographics
Inhabitants of Kervignac are called in French Kervignacois.

See also
Communes of the Morbihan department

References

External links

 Mayors of Morbihan Association 

Communes of Morbihan